Cong Zhen (born 9 February 1997) is a Chinese footballer who currently plays for Chinese Super League club Tianjin Jinmen Tiger on loan from Shanghai Shenhua.

Club career
Cong Zhen started his professional football career in 2014 when he joined China League Two side Dalian Transcendence. On 25 April 2015, he scored his first senior goal by shooting the winner in the injury time against Yinchuan Helanshan, which gave Transcendence a 4–3 away win. He transferred to Chinese Super League side Shanghai Shenhua's youth academy on 25 February 2016. Cong was promoted to Shanghai Shenhua's first team squad in 2017. On 13 May 2017, he made his first-tier debut in a 0–0 away draw against Henan Jianye as the benefactor of the league's new rule that at least one Under-23 player must be in the starting line-up and was substituted off for Tao Jin in the 37th minute.

Career statistics
.

Honours

Club
Shanghai Shenhua
Chinese FA Cup: 2017, 2019

References

External links
 

1997 births
Living people
Chinese footballers
Footballers from Dalian
Dalian Transcendence F.C. players
Shanghai Shenhua F.C. players
Wuhan F.C. players
China League Two players
Chinese Super League players
Association football midfielders